Gustavo Garetto (born 23 July 1965) is a former professional tennis player from Argentina.

Biography
Garetto, who is of Italian descent, was born in the Argentine city of Rafaela. Based in Buenos Aires, he turned professional in 1983. His best performance on tour was a quarter-final appearance at the 1987 Argentine Open in Buenos Aires, where he had a win over top 50 player Ronald Agénor en route. He won a Challenger title in doubles at Santiago in 1991, partnering Marcelo Ingaramo.

He has two children and now coaches tennis in France.

Challenger titles

Doubles: (1)

References

External links
 
 

1965 births
Living people
Argentine male tennis players
People from Rafaela
Argentine expatriate sportspeople in France
Argentine people of Italian descent
Sportspeople from Santa Fe Province